Ivan Kostić may refer to:
Ivan Kostić (footballer, born 1989), Serbian association football defender
Ivan Kostić (footballer, born 1995), Serbian association football goalkeeper
Ivan Kostić (Serbian politician) (born 1975), Dveri politician